Nirav Shah is an Indian politician who is former deputy mayor of Surat Municipal Corporation. He has been affiliated with the Bhartiya Janta Party since 1992.

Political career 
Nirav Shah was appointed as chairman of the standing committee of Surat Municipal Corporation (SMC) in July 2014. He was elected as deputy mayor of SMC in June 2018. Media outlets credited him for celebrating meatless day on 25 December 2018 — the day when SMC had decided to close their butcher houses for a day. He organized a massive tree plantation campaign in September 2020 on account of Prime Minister Narendra Modi's 70th birthday where 70,000 trees were plant all across Surat.

Controversy
During the 2020 coronavirus lockdown in India, Nirav Shah allegedly broke the rules of the government imposed lockdown and did not practise social distancing while meeting Jain monks for relief work of animals. A First Information Report was filed against him for violating section 144 of IPC, which prohibits meeting more than 4 persons at one place.

References

External links
 Official website

Living people
1971 births
Indian politicians
Bharatiya Janata Party politicians from Gujarat